Boot Lake is a lake in Lake County, in the U.S. state of Minnesota.

Boot Lake was so named on account of its outline being shaped like a boot.

See also
List of lakes in Minnesota

References

Lakes of Minnesota
Lakes of Lake County, Minnesota